Óscar Sambrano Urdaneta (February 6, 1929 – June 14, 2011) was a Venezuelan writer, essayist and literary critic, specialized in the life and work of Andrés Bello.  In 1978, he won the Municipal Prize of Literature for the work Poesía contemporánea de Venezuela. He served as the president of the Venezuelan Academy of Language, is an honorary member of the Caro y Cuervo Institute, and was president of the National Council of Culture (CONAC) in the late 1990s.  He also has hosted the television show Valores (Values).

Partial bibliography 
Cecilio Acosta, vida y obra
Apreciación literaria
"El Llanero", un problema de crítica literaria
Cronología de Andrés Bello
El epistolario de Andrés Bello
El Andrés Bello Universal
Verdades y mentiras sobre Andrés Bello
Aproximaciones a Bello
Poesía contemporánea de Venezuela
Literatura hispanoamericana (In collaboration with Domingo Miliani)
Del ser y del quehacer de Julio Garmendia

References 

  

  
El Universal, June 30, 2008. "En el País existe segregación", interview to Oscar Sambrano Urdaneta 

1929 births
2011 deaths

Central University of Venezuela alumni
Academic staff of the Central University of Venezuela
Venezuelan literary critics
Venezuelan male writers
Venezuelan essayists
Male essayists
People from Trujillo, Peru
Members of the Venezuelan Academy of Language